Maeandropolis or Maiandroupolis, also known as Maeandrus or Maiandros (Μαίανδρος),  was a town of ancient Ionia in the territory of Magnesia on the Maeander. Its name reflects association with the Maeander River, on which it was situated. It was a member of the Delian League.

Its site is tentatively located near Söke, Aydın Province, Turkey.

References

Populated places in ancient Ionia
Former populated places in Turkey
Members of the Delian League
History of Aydın Province